Michael the Black Man (born Maurice Woodside), also known as Michael Symonette and Mikael Israel, (born April 24, 1959) is an American political figure from Miami, Florida. An outspoken supporter of former US president Donald Trump, he is known for appearances at Trump's rallies before and after the 2016 election, and he often sits behind Trump holding a "Blacks for Trump" sign at these rallies.

Nation of Yahweh
Woodside first met Hulon Mitchell Jr., better known as Yahweh Ben Yahweh, in 1980. Along with his brother, Ricardo, who joined the cult before he did, Woodside was reported to have played "a big role in the rise and fall of the Nation of Yahweh" (part of the Black Hebrew Israelites movement). His mother, Johnnie Simmons, was also a devout member of the cult. He later left the cult with his sister after his mother died. 

He was one of 16 members of the Nation of Yahweh who was arrested and charged with one count of murder and one count of attempted murder in 1990. He was found not guilty of these charges by a Florida jury in 1992, but Yahweh was found guilty and sentenced to 20 years in prison. At the trial, Ricardo testified that he and Maurice attempted unsuccessfully to murder Eric Burke, a dissident member of Yahweh's cult, and that Maurice had helped to beat another cult member, Aston Green, unconscious.

Later career and reinvention
Woodside became a fervent opponent of the Democratic Party, changed his name to Michael Symonette, and began a career as a musician. He later started a radio station, BOSS 104.1 FM, before reinventing himself as "Michael the Black Man". He briefly came to media attention in September 2008, when he accused Oprah Winfrey of being the devil, and Barack Obama of being endorsed by the Ku Klux Klan, at one of Obama's speeches in Coral Gables, Florida. 

In 2012, he spoke to the audience at a Rick Santorum campaign rally in Coral Springs, Florida, where he said that the Democrats were "the worst thing that ever happened to the black man". As of August 2017, he runs multiple websites, including Gods2.com, which he frequently promotes on his shirt at Trump rallies.

References

External links 

Living people
People from Miami
American radio hosts
American civil rights activists
Musicians from Florida
American political activists
American conspiracy theorists
Black Hebrew Israelite people
Florida Republicans
Right-wing populism in the United States
African-American activists
Activists from Florida
Black conservatism in the United States
Donald Trump 2016 presidential campaign
Donald Trump 2020 presidential campaign
Tea Party movement activists
1959 births